Newcastle Football Club is a Northern Irish, intermediate football club based in Newcastle, County Down, Northern Ireland playing in Division 1A of the Northern Amateur Football League. 
The club currently has three senior teams: Newcastle FC, Newcastle Swifts and Newcastle Young Boys. Newcastle Swifts currently play in the Premier Division of the McCalls Newcastle & District league while Newcastle Young Boys play in Division 1 of the McCalls Newcastle & District league. 
The club has a number of youth teams playing in the National League, Lisburn Junior Invitational leagues and the Downpatrick Youth Football leagues (DYFL).
The First Team is currently managed by Ruairi Doran and his assistants, Wayne Lennon, Eoghan Simons and Andy Wood.

Squad

External links 
 nifootball.co.uk - (For fixtures, results and tables of Newcastle FC)
 www.thenafl.co.uk - (For club info and results on official site of league)

 

Association football clubs in Northern Ireland
Association football clubs established in 1977
Northern Amateur Football League clubs
Association football clubs in County Down
1977 establishments in Northern Ireland